The British Ambassador to the United States is in charge of the British Embassy, Washington, D.C., the United Kingdom's diplomatic mission to the United States. The official title is His Majesty's Ambassador to the United States of America.

The ambassador's residence is on Massachusetts Avenue in Washington, D.C. It was designed by Sir Edwin Lutyens and built in 1928.

Duties 
The position of ambassador to the United States is considered to be one of the most important and prestigious posts in His Majesty's Diplomatic Service, along with that of Permanent Under-Secretary of State at the Foreign and Commonwealth Office.

The ambassador's main duty is to present British policies to the American government and people, and to report American policies and views to the Government of the United Kingdom. They serve as the primary channel of communication between the two nations, and play an important role in treaty negotiations.

The ambassador is the head of the United Kingdom's consular service in the United States. As well as directing diplomatic activity in support of trade, they are ultimately responsible for visa services and for the provision of consular support to British citizens in America. They also oversee cultural relations between the two countries.

History 
The first British envoy to the United States was Sir John Temple, who was appointed consul general in 1785 and was based in New York at the estate at Richmond Hill (Manhattan) which served previously as a headquarters for George Washington.

George Hammond was appointed on 5 July 1791. He held the title of Minister in Washington or Minister to the United States of America.

In 1809, David Erskine and President James Madison negotiated a compromise on Anglo-American disputes over shipping in the Atlantic, which might have averted the War of 1812. However, the deal was rejected by King George III and the British Government recalled Erskine.

By the 1850s, the envoy's title was Her Majesty's Envoy Extraordinary and Minister Plenipotentiary to the United States of America, and the United Kingdom had consulates in several American cities. Under the direction of Sir John Crampton in 1854 and 1855, British consuls attempted to enlist American volunteers to fight in the Crimean War. The American government strenuously objected, and President Franklin Pierce asked for Crampton to be recalled. The United Kingdom refused, and in May 1856 the American government dismissed Crampton, along with the United Kingdom's consuls in New York, Philadelphia and Cincinnati. After much negotiation, the United Kingdom was allowed to re-establish its Legation in Washington the following year, and Lord Napier became the new minister.

In 1893, the British diplomatic mission in Washington was raised from a Legation to an Embassy, and Sir Julian Pauncefote, Minister since 1889, was appointed as the United Kingdom's first ambassador to the United States, with the title Her Britannic Majesty's Ambassador Extraordinary and Plenipotentiary to the United States.

The role has in the past been offered to three former Prime Ministers: the Earl of Rosebery, David Lloyd George and Sir Edward Heath, all of whom declined.

Heads of mission

Minister plenipotentiary (1791–1795) 

As a republic, the United States was not entitled to receive an ambassador. Instead, the United Kingdom dispatched a diplomat with the lower rank of minister plenipotentiary. This placed the United Kingdom on equal footing with France, which also maintained a minister plenipotentiary in the United States.

1791–1795: George Hammond

Envoy extraordinary and minister plenipotentiary (1796–1893)

In 1796, the United Kingdom raised its representation to envoy extraordinary and minister plenipotentiary, or minister. Diplomatic relations would be maintained at this rank for almost 100 years.

1796–1800: Sir Robert Liston
1800–1804: Sir Edward Thornton
1803–1806: Anthony Merry
1807–1809: Hon. David Erskine
1809–1811: Francis Jackson
1811–1812: Sir Augustus Foster
1812–1815: No representation due to the War of 1812
1815–1820: Hon. Sir Charles Bagot
1820–1824: Stratford Canning
1825–1835: Sir Charles Vaughan
1835–1843: Sir Henry Fox
1843–1847: Richard Pakenham
1849–1852: Sir Henry Bulwer
1852–1856: Sir John Crampton, Bt
1857–1858: Lord Napier
1858–1865: Lord Lyons
1865–1867: Sir Frederick Bruce
1867–1881: Sir Edward Thornton
1881–1888: Hon. Lionel Sackville-West
1889–1893: Sir Julian Pauncefote

Ambassador extraordinary and plenipotentiary (from 1893)
1893–1902: Sir Julian Pauncefote (Lord Pauncefote from 1899)
1902–1903: Hon. Sir Michael Herbert
1903–1906: Sir Mortimer Durand
1907–1913: James Bryce (later Viscount Bryce)
1913–1918: Sir Cecil Spring Rice
1918–1919: The Earl of Reading
1919–1920: Viscount Grey of Fallodon
1920–1924: Sir Auckland Geddes
1924–1930: Sir Esme Howard
1930–1939: Sir Ronald Lindsay
1939–1940: The Marquess of Lothian
1940–1946: Viscount Halifax (Earl of Halifax from 1944)
1946–1948: Lord Inverchapel
1948–1952: Sir Oliver Franks
1953–1956: Sir Roger Makins
1956–1961: Sir Harold Caccia
1961–1965: Hon. Sir David Ormsby-Gore (Lord Harlech from 1964)
1965–1969: Sir Patrick Dean
1969–1971: Rt. Hon. John Freeman
1971–1974: The Earl of Cromer
1974–1977: Hon. Sir Peter Ramsbotham
1977–1979: Hon. Peter Jay
1979–1982: Sir Nicholas Henderson
1982–1986: Sir Oliver Wright
1986–1991: Sir Antony Acland
1991–1995: Sir Robin Renwick
1995–1997: Sir John Kerr
1997–2003: Sir Christopher Meyer
2003–2007: Sir David Manning
2007–2012: Sir Nigel Sheinwald
2012–2016: Sir Peter Westmacott

2016–2019: Lord Darroch of Kew
2020–present: Dame Karen Pierce

Ambassadors in fiction 
 Sir Everard Everett, in Wodehouse's Jeeves and the Feudal Spirit
 Lord John Marbury, in NBC's The West Wing.
 Sir Mark Brydon, in the BBC's The State Within.

See also 
 United States Ambassador to the United Kingdom
 Canadian ambassadors to the United States – replacing the role of the British Ambassador to the US (and Foreign Secretary of State for the Colonies) in dealing with diplomatic relations for Canada after 1926

References

External links 
UK and United States of America, gov.uk

 
United States of America
United Kingdom